Alexandre Bouchard (born 1 May 1988) is a French professional footballer who last played for Chamois Niortais as a goalkeeper. He previously played in Ligue 2 with LB Châteauroux, and has also represented Eu, Carquefou and Paris FC.

Career statistics

External links
 
 Alexandre Bouchard statistics at foot-national.com
 

1988 births
Living people
People from Grande-Synthe
French footballers
Association football goalkeepers
LB Châteauroux players
USJA Carquefou players
Paris FC players
Chamois Niortais F.C. players
Ligue 2 players
Championnat National players
Sportspeople from Nord (French department)
Footballers from Hauts-de-France